The 1980–81 season was Manchester United's 79th season in the Football League, and their 6th consecutive season in the top division of English football. It was the last of their four seasons under the management of Dave Sexton, who was sacked after the end of the season after failing to win the club a major trophy. The likes of Lawrie McMenemy, Brian Clough, Bobby Robson and Ron Saunders were all linked with the job, before Sexton was succeeded by West Bromwich Albion manager Ron Atkinson.

The club also paid a club record of more than £1 million for Nottingham Forest striker Garry Birtles, but the player was a huge disappointment and ended the season with just one goal from 28 appearances. The club's top scorer was Joe Jordan, who found the back of the net 15 times.

United were indeed one of the hardest teams to beat in the First Division this season, losing just nine out of 42 games and winning their final seven, but they were also held to a draw on 18 occasions. This restricted them to eighth-place finish - not even enough for a UEFA Cup place.

First Division

FA Cup

League Cup

UEFA Cup

Squad statistics

References

Manchester United F.C. seasons
Manchester United